The Songs of thanksgiving are a series of Jewish prayers that are recited during pesukei dezimra.

Origin
During the temple service during the days of the temple, a series of thanksgiving prayers were recited. These have since become incorporated into daily prayer.

Placement in service
While Nusach Ashkenaz recites Hodu Barukh she'amar, Sephardi custom recites it beforehand. Some explain that the Ashkenazic practice is based the current world being called the World of Yezirah, a world that is not repaired, and therefore one that does not receive light from itself, whereas the Sephardic practice is to recite these prayers are recited before Barukh She'amar because the prayers receive tikkun from assiah, as they follow Kaddish.  Others explain that Nusach Ashkenaz recites the after Barukh She'amar because Barukh She'amar serves as an opening to the praises of G-d, whereas the Sephardic practice recites it after because Hodu is from Chronicles (rather than Psalms) and Barukh She'amar says that we recite the "Songs of David".

Psalm 100 is recited after Barukh She'amar in all rites.

Prayers included
The songs of thanksgiving are:

Hodu
Hodu Lashem Kir'u Bishmo, or "Hodu" (from ). This is the longer one of the thanksgiving prayers. It was first recited by David after he recovered the ark from the Philistines. Following this event, it became a standard prayer.

Psalm 100

Psalm 100 is the shorter prayer. The psalm expresses thanks to God for all the miracles that happen to us each day in total oblivion, as we are routinely in danger without even knowing it.

Psalm 100 is omitted by Ashkenazi Jews on Shabbat, Yom Tov, the Eve of Yom Kippur, the Eve of Passover, and the intermediate days of Passover. On Shabbat and Yom Tov, it is omitted because offering Thanksgiving is voluntary, and therefore is not done on days with Shabbat-like restrictions. On the Eve of Passover, it is omitted because during the temple service, one may not be able to finish eating the offering, which was chametz, before the time in which it was forbidden to eat chametz. On Passover, it is omitted because of its chametz content. On the Eve of Yom Kippur, it is omitted because one may not be able to finish the contents before the fast sets in.

Sephardim still recite it on the Eves of Yom Kippur and Passover, and segment of them still recites it on Shabbat and Yom Tov.

In the Italian rite, this Psalm is recited only on Shabbat and Yom Tov, and during the week it is omitted.

References

Pesukei dezimra
Siddur of Orthodox Judaism